The 1963 UC Davis Aggies football team represented the University of California, Davis as a member of the Far Western Conference (FWC) during the 1963 NCAA College Division football season. Led by Will Lotter in his eighth and final season as head coach, the Aggies compiled an overall record of 6–2–1 with a mark of 3–1–1 in conference play, sharing the FWC title with Humboldt State and San Francisco State. The team outscored its opponents 151 to 74 for the season. The Aggies played home games at Toomey Field in Davis, California.

In eight seasons under coach Lotter, the Aggies compiled an overall record of 26–43–3, for a winning percentage of .382. They won or shared the conference championship twice, in 1956 and 1963.

The UC Davis sports teams were commonly called the "Cal Aggies" from 1924 until the mid-1970s.

Schedule

Notes

References

UC Davis
UC Davis Aggies football seasons
Northern California Athletic Conference football champion seasons
UC Davis Aggies football